Timo Lumme (born 13 June 1961) is the Finnish Managing Director of the IOC television and Marketing Services of the International Olympic Committee (IOC). He is therefore responsible for the IOC's Global Sponsorship Program.

Life

He studied law at King's College London. He moved to Amsterdam for 3 years in 1997 to work as the European Sports Marketing Director for Nike. He then moved back to England in 2000 to work for ESPN. He moved to Vaud, Switzerland in 2004 to work for the IOC.

Family

Timo Lumme married an English woman, Nicola Driver, in 1997. He now has a son and a daughter, born in 1998 and 2000.

References

 IOC, 2010. Biography. [Online] Available at: http://www.dow.com/news/multimedia/media_kits/2010_07_16a/pdfs/Timo_Lumme_Bio.pdf [Accessed 11 December 2012].
 Lumme, T., 2008. Timo Lumme [Interview] (23 May 2008).

1961 births
Living people
Alumni of King's College London
Finnish businesspeople
Finnish expatriates in England
Finnish expatriates in Switzerland
Finnish expatriates in the Netherlands